Back on the Right Track is the ninth studio album by Sly and the Family Stone, released by Warner Bros. Records in 1979. The album was, as its title alludes to, an overt comeback attempt for Sly Stone. However, the album and its singles, "Remember Who You Are" and "The Same Thing (Makes You Laugh, Makes You Cry)", failed to live up to expectations.

Some of the original Family Stone members, including Cynthia Robinson, Pat Rizzo, Freddie Stone, and Rose Stone, make contributions to this album. Back on the Right Track is the first Sly Stone album not to be produced by the artist; Mark Davis was in charge of the project.

Back on the Right Track and the following studio release, Ain't But the One Way, were combined by Rhino Records into a compilation called Who in the Funk Do You Think You Are: The Warner Bros. Recordings in 2001.

Track listing
All songs credit Sly Stone as songwriter; except "Remember Who You Are", written by Sly Stone and Hamp Banks

Side A
 "Remember Who You Are" - 3:16
 "Back on the Right Track" - 3:20
 "If It's Not Addin' Up...." - 2:41
 "The Same Thing (Makes You Laugh, Makes You Cry)" - 2:40

Side B
 "Shine It On" - 4:51
 "It Takes All Kinds" - 2:57
 "Who's to Say" - 2:49
 "Sheer Energy" - 3:33

Personnel 
Sylvester Stewart - vocals, keyboards, harmonica
Mark Davis - keyboards
Walter Downing - keyboards
Alvin Taylor - drums
Keni Burke - bass
Hamp Banks - guitar
Joseph Baker - guitar
Roscoe Peterson - guitar
Ollie E. Brown - percussion
Cynthia Robinson - trumpet
Tom DeCourcey - trombone
Pat Rizzo - saxophone
 Steve Madaio, Gary Herbig, Fred Smith - horns
Rose Banks, Lisa Banks, Joe Baker, Freddie Stewart - backing vocals
Technical
Karat Faye - engineer

References

1979 albums
Sly and the Family Stone albums
Warner Records albums